Bonetto is a surname. Notable people with the surname include:

Aline Bonetto, French production designer and set decorator
Felice Bonetto (1903–1953), racing driver
Jani Bonetto, a cast member from the 1987 Argentine drama film Babilonia
Joseph Bonetto (1921–1988), Democratic member of the Pennsylvania House of Representatives
Mattia Bonetto (born 1997), Italian professional footballer
Riccardo Bonetto (born 1979), Italian footballer

Fictional characters
Bonetto, a character from the 1975 Italian thriller film The Sunday Woman